Senftenberg may refer to:
Senftenberg, a town in southern Brandenburg, Germany
Senftenberg, Austria
Žamberk, a town in the Pardubice Region of the Czech Republic, known as Senftenberg in German